"Hillbilly Shoes" is a song recorded by American country music duo Montgomery Gentry.  It was released in February 1999 as their debut single and the lead-off single to their debut album Tattoos & Scars.  It peaked at number 13 in the United States, and number 7 in Canada.  It was written by Bobby Taylor, Mike Geiger and Woody Mullis. The song features Troy Gentry singing lead but in some parts there's Eddie Montgomery singing alone as lead vocals.

Critical reception
Deborah Evans Price, of Billboard magazine reviewed the song favorably, calling it a "high-energy brand of traditional country blended with loads of outlaw attitude." She goes on to say that the song has an "absolutely infectious guitar riff, sassy sawing fiddles, and Gentry's high-octane lead vocal."

Music video
The music video was directed by Chris Rogers and premiered in early 1999.

Chart positions
"Hillbilly Shoes" debuted at number 70 on the U.S. Billboard Hot Country Singles & Tracks for the week of February 13, 1999.

Year-end charts

References

1999 songs
1999 debut singles
Montgomery Gentry songs
Columbia Nashville Records singles
Songs written by Mike Geiger
Songs written by Woody Mullis